This list of the mayflies recorded in the British Isles follows Macadam, with nomenclature and taxonomy according to Kluge. There are 51 species of mayfly known to occur in the British Isles, distributed among ten families.

Ameletidae
Ameletus inopinatus Eaton, 1887

Arthropleidae
Arthroplea congener Bengtsson, 1908

Baetidae

Alainites muticus (Linnaeus, 1758)
Baetis buceratus Eaton, 1870
Baetis fuscatus (Linnaeus, 1761)
Baetis rhodani (Pictet, 1843)
Baetis scambus Eaton, 1870
Baetis vernus Curtis, 1834
Centroptilum luteolum (Muller, 1776)
Cloeon dipterum (Linnaeus, 1761)
Cloeon simile Eaton, 1870
Labiobaetis atrebatinus (Eaton, 1870)
Nigrobaetis digitatus (Bengtsson, 1919)
Nigrobaetis niger (Linnaeus, 1761)
Procloeon bifidum (Bengtsson, 1912)
Procloeon pennulatum (Eaton, 1870)

Caenidae

Brachycercus harrisellus Curtis, 1834
Caenis beskidensis Sowa, 1973
Caenis horaria (Linnaeus, 1758)
Caenis luctuosa (Burmeister, 1839)
Caenis macrura Stephens, 1835
Caenis pseudorivulorum Keffermüller, 1960
Caenis pusilla Navás, 1913
Caenis rivulorum Eaton, 1884
Caenis robusta Eaton, 1884

Ephemeridae

Ephemera danica Müller, 1764
Ephemera lineata Eaton, 1870
Ephemera vulgata Linnaeus, 1758

Ephemerellidae
Ephemerella ignita (Poda, 1761)
Ephemerella notata Eaton, 1887

Heptageniidae

Ecdyonurus dispar (Curtis, 1834)
Ecdyonurus insignis (Eaton, 1870)
Ecdyonurus torrentis Kimmins, 1942
Ecdyonurus venosus (Fabricius, 1775)
Electrogena affinis (Eaton, 1870)
Electrogena lateralis (Curtis, 1834)
Heptagenia longicauda (Stephens, 1835)
Heptagenia sulphurea (Müller, 1764)
Kageronia fuscogrisea (Retzius, 1783)
Rhithrogena germanica Eaton, 1870
Rhithrogena semicolorata (Curtis, 1834)

Leptophlebiidae
Habrophlebia fusca (Curtis, 1834)
Leptophlebia marginata (Linnaeus, 1767)
Leptophlebia vespertina (Linnaeus, 1758)
Paraleptophlebia cincta (Retzius, 1783)
Paraleptophlebia submarginata (Stephens, 1835)
Paraleptophlebia werneri Ulmer, 1920

Potamanthidae
Potamanthus luteus (Linnaeus, 1767)

Siphlonuridae
Siphlonurus alternatus (Say, 1824)
Siphlonurus armatus Eaton, 1870
Siphlonurus lacustris Eaton, 1870

References

Lists of insects in the British Isles